Burnie High School is a government comprehensive secondary school for  boys and girls located in , a suburb of , Tasmania, Australia. Established in 1916, the school caters for approximately 600 students from Years 7 to 10
|10]]. The college is administered by the Tasmanian Department of Education.

In 2019 student enrolments were 567. The school principal is Trudy Durkin.

Facilities 
In April 2007, the old, original Burnie High School building was gutted by fire. The old school had been built in 1929 and following the fire, many of its remains had to be demolished for safety reasons. The building had been due to become the new home of the Creative Paper company and the new Burnie Visitor Centre. Instead a new building was built on the site in the years following the fire.

Burnie High School is located behind Cooee Primary School in Fidler Street, Cooee. Other high schools located in the area are Parklands and Wynyard High Schools and Marist Regional College.

In March 2017, the school was one of eighteen high schools expanded to cover Years 11 and 12.

Productions 
Every second year Burnie High School puts on a production. 2007's production was Gumshoe: The Spy Musical, which was also performed by Burnie High School in 1997. Other past musical productions undertaken by the school include: How the West was Warped, Sheik Rattle 'n' Roll, Zombied, Jungle Fantasy and Bats.

Notable alumni
 Ron Cornishformer politician who represented Braddon in the Tasmanian House of Assembly for the Liberals
 Brady GreyAustralian rules footballer
 Bryan Greenpolitician who represented Braddon in the Tasmanian House of Assembly for Labor
 Alastair LynchAustralian rules footballer for Fitzroy, the Brisbane Bears, and Brisbane Lions
 Frank NeaseyPuisne Judge of the Supreme Court of Tasmania
 Ian Ristsports shooter who won the Australian and Commonwealth Clay Target Shooting championship

See also 
 List of schools in Tasmania
 Education in Tasmania

References

Further reading 
 Wilson, G.J. 1991. Burnie High School 1916-1991.
 Burnie High School Darwinian 2005/2006

External links 
 Burnie High School on The Names Database
 BHS at the Tasmanian Department of Education
 The City of Burnie - "Gumshoe" A production by Burnie High School

Public high schools in Tasmania
Educational institutions established in 1916
1916 establishments in Australia
Burnie, Tasmania